Tarek Boukhmis (born 14 April 1980) is an Algerian handball player for JSE Skikda.

He competed for the Algerian national team at the 2015 World Men's Handball Championship in Qatar, which was his first appearance at the World Championships.

References

1980 births
Living people
Algerian male handball players
African Games bronze medalists for Algeria
African Games medalists in handball
Competitors at the 2011 All-Africa Games
21st-century Algerian people